Gimlet may refer to:

Arts, entertainment, and media
 Gimlet Media, a media network that produces journalistic and narrative podcasts
 Gimlet (Transformers), a fictional character
 Captain Lorrington "Gimlet" King, a fictional character in a series of novels by W. E. Johns

Places

United Kingdom
 Gimlet Rock, Wales, United Kingdom

United States
 Gimlet, Idaho, an unincorporated town in the United States
 Gimlet, Kentucky, an unincorporated town in the United States
 Gimlet Bridge, a Pegram truss bridge in Idaho, United States
 Gimlet Creek (Missouri), United States
 Gimlet Creek (South Dakota), United States

Technology
 Gimlet (rocket), an air-to-air unguided rocket
 Gimlet (tool), a hand tool for drilling small holes
 SA-16 Gimlet, a surface-to-air missile

Other uses
 Gimlet (cocktail), a cocktail typically made of gin or vodka and lime juice
 Gimlet (eucalypt), Eucalyptus (plant) in the series Contortae
 21st Infantry Regiment (United States), a unit in the United States Army that is nicknamed Gimlets